Nature Reviews Disease Primers is a peer-reviewed medical journal published by Nature Portfolio. It was established in 2015. The editor-in-chief is Clemens Thoma. The journal publishes broad review articles about disease areas, offering a global overview of the field and outlining "key open research questions". Each "Primer" is accompanied by a "PrimeView" summary poster containing accessible artwork and highlighting key points from the review. The journal's five year anniversary was celebrated in April 2020, and noted that 225 primers had been published on medical topics.

Abstracting and indexing
The journal is abstracted and indexed in Index Medicus/MEDLINE/PubMed.

According to the Journal Citation Reports, the journal has a 2021 impact factor of 65.038, ranking it 5th out of 172 journals in the category "Medicine General & Internal".

References

External links

General medical journals
Nature Research academic journals
Publications established in 2015
Review journals
English-language journals
Continuous journals